Nordenskiold Glacier, is a large glacier in Qeqertalik Municipality, on the Western coast of Greenland.

Geography
This glacier has its terminus south of Disko Bay and north of Arfersiorfik Fjord.
It drains the Greenland ice sheet westwards into the Tasiusarsuaq.

See also
List of glaciers in Greenland

References

Glaciers of Greenland